Events from the year 1356 in Ireland.

Incumbent
Lord: Edward III

Events

 Richard d'Askeaton appointed Lord Chancellor of Ireland

Births

Deaths

References

 
1350s in Ireland
Ireland
Years of the 14th century in Ireland